Mescalito is the first studio album by American country rock singer/songwriter Ryan Bingham, released in 2007 through Lost Highway Records and produced by Marc Ford.

Production 
The album was released after three self-produced albums by Bingham and his band, the Dead Horses. Some of the tracks in Mescalito, such as "South Side of Heaven" (the main single from the album) and "Long Way From Georgia" were taken from the Dead Horses albums (specifically, from Wishbone Saloon). The album encompasses several traditional American and Mexican styles, including bluegrass, country rock, southern rock, blues, americana and mariachi ("Boracho Station").

Mescalito was produced by guitarist Marc Ford (of Black Crowes fame) and features several prominent artists of the country and southern rock scene, such as Terry Allen (who makes a cameo appearance in "Ghost of Travelin' Jones"), Joe Ely, and Marc Ford himself, who plays electric guitar in "The Other Side" and "Bread and Water" and slide guitar in "Hard Times". A different version of "The Other Side" was also included in Marc Ford's album Weary and Wired.

Reception 

The album was generally well received by critics, who praised Bingham's songwriting as well as the expressiveness of his voice, that was compared to those of Tom Waits and Steve Earle, although some described Bingham's style as too manieristic and monotonous. Besides Earle and Allen, Rolling Stones, John Mellencamp, Bruce Springsteen and Joe Strummer have been cited as obvious influences in Bingham's work.

The main single "Southside of Heaven" was well received commercially, and was included in the score of an episode of the E.R. TV series.

Track listing 
 "Southside of Heaven" – 6:19
 "The Other Side" – 2:11
 "Bread and Water" – 4:08
 "Don't Wait For Me" – 4:56
 "Boracho Station" – 2:03
 "Sunshine" – 4:20
 "Ghost of Travelin' Jones" – 4:09
 "Hard Times" – 4:38
 "Dollar a Day" – 2:11
 "Take It Easy Mama" – 3:03
 "Long Way From Georgia" – 3:54
 "Ever Wonder Why" - 4:59
 "Sunrise" - 4:45
 "For What It's Worth" - 13:58

Credits 
 Jeb Venable - Bass
 Bukka Allen - Accordion
 Joe Allen - Bass
 Terry Allen - Piano, Vocals ("Ghost of Travelin' Jones")
 Anthony "Antoine" Arvizu - Tambourine, Producer, Engineer, Mixing
 Kevin Bartley - Mastering
 John Bazz - Bass (Upright)
 Melanie Bellomo - Cover Photo
 Ryan Bingham - Guitar (Acoustic), Harmonica, Vocals, Vocals (background), Handclapping, Slide Guitar, Shaker, Author, Foot Stomping
 Stéphane Bossard - Banjo
 Brent Bowers - Artist Coordination
 Kim Buie - A&R
 Jason Carter - Fiddle
 Boyd Elder - Illustrations
 David Ferguson - Engineer
 Marc Ford - Guitar (Acoustic), Bass, Guitar (Electric), Organ (Hammond), Tambourine, Producer, Slide Guitar, Shaker, Mixing, Lap Steel Guitar, Hi Hat, Papoose
 Jon Gries - Photography
 Lucas Hoge - Producer
 Coy Koehler - Photography
 David Krepinevich - Assistant Engineer
 Jeff Lightning Lewis - Assistant Engineer
 Rick Lonow - Percussion, Drums
 Mike Malone - Piano, Organ (Hammond)
 Carlton Moody - Producer
 Doug Moreland - Fiddle
 Karen Naff - Design
 Corby Schaub - Mandolin, Guitar (Electric), Vocals (background), Handclapping, Foot Stomping, Kettle Drums
 Matt Smith - Percussion, Drums
 Brian Standefer - Cello, Engineer
 Mike Starr - Fiddle, Slide Guitar

Music videos 
 (Directed/ Produced by Anna Axster)
 (Directed/ Produced by Anna Axster)

References 

2007 albums
Ryan Bingham albums
Lost Highway Records albums